Sinchi Football Club (Chinese: 新麒足球俱乐部) is a professional soccer club from China which played as a foreign team in Singapore's S.League from 2003 to 2005. The club played its home games in Singapore at the Jurong Stadium. The team's best league finish was seventh-place in 2003. In December 2005, after three seasons, the club's management announced that they would not be participating in the S.League again in the 2006 season.

2003/04 players

Seasons 

 2003 saw the introduction of penalty shoot-outs if a match ended in a draw in regular time. Winners of penalty shoot-outs gained two points instead of one.

Notable former players 
  Shi Jiayi
  Qiu Li
  Xie Yuxin
  Jiang Feng
  Zhang Meng
  Li Benjian
  Jiang Tao

External links 

 http://www.weltfussballarchiv.com/Vereinsprofilnew.php?ID=10486

 

Foreign teams in Singapore football leagues
Expatriated football clubs
Singapore Premier League clubs